Flight 624 may refer to:

United Airlines Flight 624, crashed on 17 June 1948
Air Canada Flight 624, crashed on 29 March 2015

0624